Magude District is a district of Maputo Province in southern Mozambique. The principal town is Magude. The district is located in the north of the province, and borders with Massingir and Chókwè Districts of Gaza Province in the north, Manhiça District in the east, Moamba District in the south, and with South Africa in the west. It has a population of 53,317 as of 2007.

Geography
The principal river in the district is the Komati River. Other rivers, such as the Mazimuchopes River, the Massintonto River, and the Uanétze River, are seasonal and only flow during the rainy season.

The climate is subtropical dry, with the annual rainfall being .

History
The name Magude originates from Magudzo Cossa, a Xhosa king who was active in the area in the second half of the 19th century. Before 1874, the Magude Circunscrição, an administrative unit in colonial Portuguese Africa, was established, but the descendants of Magudzo Cossa retained the traditional role of the chiefs and were incorporated into the government.

Demographics
As of 2005, 42% of the population of the district was younger than 15 years. 41% of the population spoke Portuguese. The most common mothertongue among the population was Xichangana. 59% were analphabetic, mostly women.

Administrative divisions
The district is divided into five postos, Magude, Mapulanguene, Mahela, Motaze, and Panjane, which in total contain 18 localities.

Economy
6% of the households in the district have access to electricity.

Agriculture
In the district, there are 7,500 farms which have on average  of land. The main agricultural products are corn, cassava, cowpea, peanut, and sweet potato.

Transportation
There is a bridge over the Komati River, which requires a restoration.

References

Further reading
Heidi Gengenbach, "Binding Memories: Women as Makers and Tellers of History in Magude, Mozambique." Columbia U Press, 2004.

Districts in Maputo Province